In Pakistan, a medical school is more often referred to as a medical college. A medical college is affiliated with a university as a department which usually has a separate campus. The medical schools in province of Sindh are both private and public.

List of medical colleges

See also
List of medical organizations in Pakistan
List of medical schools
List of medical schools in Karachi
Pakistan Medical and Dental Council
List of dental colleges in Pakistan

References

Sindh